No.1 Spinningfields (formerly 1 Hardman Square) is a  office tower in the Spinningfields district of Manchester city centre, England.

The development was previously known as 1 Hardman Square which was a  skyscraper but was cancelled in 2009. Demolition of the former building on the site, Quay House, began in early 2015 and construction of its replacement began shortly afterwards.

Background

1 Hardman Square (2004-2013)
The skyscraper was first proposed in 2004, linking in with the new developments in Spinningfields and the growth in proposals for skyscrapers in the city at the time. The financial crisis of 2007–2008 paralysed the development market, particularly in the expensive sector of constructing skyscrapers.

In 2011, it was reported that developers of the tower, Allied London, were on the verge of sealing a £165m deal with German fund manager, Union Investment. As part of the deal, Union Investments forward-purchased 1 Hardman Square, which gave Allied London the capital to construct the skyscraper. Construction of the skyscraper was dependent on whether Allied London could sign up tenants for half the building, which reportedly could have taken up to two years as the economy recovered.

No.1 Spinningfields (2014-2017)
Following the news in 2011 that a deal to build a  Grade A office tower of 20-storeys was possible, plans for such a scheme were finally released in January 2014 and submitted for planning permission. As of 2023, the building is Manchester's tallest office building built since City Tower was constructed in 1965.

References

Skyscrapers in Manchester
Buildings and structures in Manchester